Wien is the German language name for Vienna, the city and federal state in Austria. 

Wien may also refer to:

Surname
Lawrence Wien (1905–1988), American lawyer and real estate investor
Max Wien (1866–1938), German physicist, inventor of the Wien bridge
Noel Wien (1899–1977), American aviator
Wilhelm Wien (1864–1928), German physicist, formulator of Wien's Law

Places in the United States
Wien, Missouri, a community in the United States
Wien, Wisconsin, a town
Wien (community), Wisconsin, an unincorporated community

Other uses
Theater an der Wien, a theater in Vienna located at the former river Wien
Wien (river), in Vienna, Austria
Wien Air Alaska, American airline 1927–1985
Wien International Scholarship, a scholarship instituted by Brandeis University
Wien bridge oscillator, a type of electronic oscillator
Wien's displacement law, law of physics